Justice Buchanan may refer to:

Alexander McKenzie Buchanan (1805–1868), associate justice of the Louisiana Supreme Court
Archibald C. Buchanan (1890–1979), associate justice of the Supreme Court of Virginia
Arthur S. Buchanan (1856–1919), associate justice of the Tennessee Supreme Court
John Buchanan (Maryland judge) (1772–1844), associate justice and chief justice of the Maryland Court of Appeals
John A. Buchanan (1843–1921), associate justice of the Supreme Court of Virginia
Peter Buchanan (judge) (1943–2014), judge of the Supreme Court of Victoria